Gasmann is a surname. Notable people with the surname include:

Hans Møller Gasmann (1872–1961), Norwegian educator and Scout leader
Jens Gasmann (1776–1850), Norwegian businessman and politician
Tull Gasmann (1927–2005), Norwegian alpine skier

See also
Gasman (disambiguation)